Paul John Heaton (born 24 January 1961) is an English former footballer who played as a midfielder for Oldham Athletic and Rochdale.

In 1986, he moved to Finland to play for Rovaniemen Palloseura, Kuusysi Lahti, PU-62 Mikkeli, and Kajaanin Haka. He then became a coach at FC Tarmo and FC Haka.

References

Living people
Oldham Athletic A.F.C. players
Rochdale A.F.C. players
Rovaniemen Palloseura players
FC Kuusysi players
Kajaanin Haka players
1961 births
People from Hyde, Greater Manchester
English footballers
Association football midfielders